Wollert is a surname. Notable people with the surname include:

Carl Wollert (1877–1953), Swedish sports shooter
Edward Wollert (1895–1964), American World War I veteran
Heide Wollert (born 1982), German judoka

See also
Wollert (given name)